Spesolimab, sold under the brand name Spevigo, is a monoclonal antibody medication used for the treatment of generalized pustular psoriasis (GPP). It is an interleukin-36 receptor (IL1RL2/IL1RAP) antibody.

It was approved for medical use in the United States in September 2022, and in European Union in December 2022. The US Food and Drug Administration (FDA) considers it to be a first-in-class medication.

Society and culture

Legal status 
On 13 October 2022, the Committee for Medicinal Products for Human Use (CHMP) of the European Medicines Agency (EMA) adopted a positive opinion, recommending the granting of a conditional marketing authorization for the medicinal product Spevigo, intended for the treatment of flares in adult patients with generalised pustular psoriasis. The applicant for this medicinal product is Boehringer Ingelheim International GmbH. Spesolimab was approved for medical use in the European Union in December 2022.

References

External links 
 

Boehringer Ingelheim
Breakthrough therapy
Monoclonal antibodies
Orphan drugs